Nemophora violellus is a moth of the Adelidae family. It is found in most of Europe, except Ireland, Great Britain, Belgium, part of the Balkan Peninsula, Fennoscandia and the Baltic region.

Adults have uniformly dark brown forewings with an oily tint, They are on wing in July.

The larvae feed on Gentiana asclepiadea, Gentiana pneumonanthe and Gentiana cruciata.

References

External links
lepiforum.de
Species info at nkis.info

Moths described in 1851
Adelidae
Moths of Europe